Malabai is an Indian goddess.  She is also known as Malganga Devi, Mulika Devi, and Malai Devi.  She came from the Varanasi area and settled at Kunda.  She has 6 sisters in different places.  Nighoj is famous for the Malabai Temple and Kund (Potholes).
There are 7 places of 7 sister of Malganga Devi
1 Nighoj(Main place)
2 Chincholi
3 Darewadi
4 Dholwad
5 Karandi
6 Belapur
7 Umbraj.

Hindu goddesses